

The Saab 36 (also known as Projekt 1300) was a supersonic bomber planned by Saab AB during the 1950s. The aircraft was intended to be able to carry an 800 kg free-falling nuclear weapon, but the Swedish nuclear weapons program was cancelled in the 1960s; the plans for the bomber had been cancelled in 1957.  The Saab 36 was to be fitted with delta wings, as was the Saab 35 Draken fighter. The engine was to be a version of the British Bristol Olympus turbojet, the same engine powering the Avro Vulcan jet bomber.

Specifications (as designed)

See also

References

Bibliography
 .

36
Abandoned military aircraft projects of Sweden
Twinjets
Nuclear weapons programme of Sweden
Low-wing aircraft